Cradoc may refer to:

 Cradoc, Powys, a small village in the United Kingdom
 Cradoc, Tasmania, a small township in Australia